is a Japanese manga artist, best known as the creator of the multicultural hit, Shaman King.

Career
Hiroyuki Takei started drawing manga with writer EXIAD on SD Département Store Series which they created for a fanzine. At that time, he also submitted his first yomikiri Dragdoll Group to the Tezuka Award but was rejected. In 1994, Takei submitted his short story Anna the Itako to the 48th Tezuka Award and won the honorable mention. He was later introduced to Nobuhiro Watsuki and became his assistant along with Eiichiro Oda on Rurouni Kenshin.

Takei published his short story Death Zero in Weekly Shōnen Jump winter special and Butsu Zone in the summer special of 1996. A reworked version of Butsu Zone became his first manga series published in Weekly Shōnen Jump of 1997. Takei's longest-running series, Shaman King began serialization in Shueisha's Weekly Shōnen Jump in 1998, though was forced to conclude in 2004. In 2007, Takei returned three years after the conclusion of Shaman King with a new Weekly Shōnen Jump series, entitled Jumbor Barutronica. Set in the distant future, construction workers pilot mecha. One of them is killed and his memories are implanted in his clone, a thirty-year-old man in a five-year-old superpowered construction tool body. The series was canceled after ten issues and released in one volume.

During the Jump Festa 2008, Shueisha announced a kanzenban reprint of Shaman King. This release reprinted the entire series in 27 volumes complete with new covers while concluding the never-before-published "true ending." On March 4, 2008, Japanese publisher Shūeisha announced that Takei would be collaborating on Karakuri Dôji Ultimo with American comic creator Stan Lee. The project launched with the new Jump SQ.II (Jump Square Second) spinoff manga magazine on April 18, 2008. The announcement of the partnership was made in the April issue of Jump Square magazine.

On February 15, 2017, when answering a fan's question, Hiroyuki Takei revealed on his official Twitter that he received an offer for an anime remake of his representative work Shaman King, but had to turn it down because they were not able to use the first anime's voice actors and soundtrack music. In June 2020, a new anime television series was announced, which aired from April 1, 2021 to April 21, 2022 and featured several returning cast members from the 2001 anime series in both the Japanese and the English dub.

Inspiration
Takei named Hirohiko Araki's series JoJo's Bizarre Adventure and Baoh as his favorite manga when he was younger. In an interview with Shonen Jump, he also cited Taiyo Kosoku by Baru, Blade of the Immortal by Hiroaki Samura, and Hellboy by Mike Mignola as favorites. Takei has also been influenced by American comic books, Mecha anime and Osamu Tezuka.

Works

Serializations
{| class="wikitable sortable"
|-
! From !! To !! English Translated Title !! Serialized in !! Volumes !! Information
|-
| 1997
| 1997
| Butsu Zone
| Weekly Shōnen Jump
| 3 tankōbon, 2 kanzenban
|
|-
| 1998
| 2004
| Shaman King
| Weekly Shōnen Jump
| 32 tankōbon, 27 kanzenban, 35 eBooks
| Final kanzenban released in 2009 with previously unpublished material.
|-
| 2007
| 2007
| Jumbor Barutronica
| Weekly Shōnen Jump
| 1 tankōbon, 2 kanzenban
|
|-
| 2009
| 2015
| Karakuri Dôji Ultimo
| Jump SQ (2009—2011), Jump SQ.19 (2012—2015)
| 12 tankōbon
| Stan Lee (concept)
|-
| 2010
| —
| Jumbor
| Ultra Jump
| 7 tankōbon
| Hiromasa Mikami (writer)
|-
| 2012
| 2014
| Shaman King: Flowers
| Jump X
| 6 tankōbon
|
|-
| 2015
| —
| Hyper Dash! Yonkurō
| CoroCoro Aniki
| 4 tankōbon (on-going)
| Spin-off of Zaurus Tokuda's Dash! Yonkuro
|-
| 2015 
| 2018
| Nekogahara
| Shōnen Magazine Edge
|5 tankōbon
|
|-
|2018
|—
|Shaman King: The Super Star
|Shōnen Magazine Edge
|5 tankōbon (on-going)|
|}

One-shots

Shaman King specials

FanzinesJumbor Japon (Self-published and sold out at Comiket 73)

Unreleased
 (Concept/Script:EXIAD)
 (Rejected submission for the Tezuka Awards)

Character design
Anna Kyoyama from Shaman King is the mascot for the police station in the Aomori Prefecture.
 was a series of toys and a manga created for Takara Tomy. Takei was hired as art supervisor and one of his assistants, drew the manga which ran in V Jump during issue number 8 to 10 in 2006. The series was canceled after 3 chapters and never met the intended 197 pages announced in the first chapter.
Takei did the character design of Garo: The Animation.
Takei did the original character designs for the original anime series, Shine On! Bakumatsu Bad Boys!.

Other Works
 Illustrator for the Cardfight!! Vanguard'' Trading Card Games.

References

External links
Official Twitter
Hiroyuki Takei - the soul of Shaman King - Documentary portrait of Hiroyuki Takei

 
1972 births
Living people
Manga artists from Aomori Prefecture
Yomogita, Aomori